The 20th Annual Grammy Awards were held February 23, 1978, and were broadcast live on American television. They were hosted by John Denver and recognized accomplishments by musicians from the year 1977.

Award winners 

Record of the Year
Bill Szymczyk (producer) & The Eagles for "Hotel California"
Album of the Year
Ken Caillat, Richard Dashut (producers) & Fleetwood Mac (producers and artist) for Rumours
Song of the Year
Barbra Streisand & Paul Williams (songwriters) for "Evergreen (Love Theme from A Star Is Born)" performed by Barbra Streisand
Joe Brooks (songwriter) for "You Light Up My Life" performed by Debby Boone
Best New Artist
Debby Boone

Children's

Best Recording for Children
Christopher Cerf & Jim Timmens (producers) for Aren't You Glad You're You performed by various artists

Classical

Best Classical Orchestral Performance
Gunther Breest (producer), Carlo Maria Giulini (conductor) & the Chicago Symphony Orchestra for Mahler: Symphony No. 9 in D
Best Classical Vocal Soloist Performance
Neville Marriner (conductor), Janet Baker & the Academy of St. Martin in the Fields for Bach: Arias
Best Opera Recording
Thomas Z. Shepard (producer), John De Main (conductor), Donnie Albert, Carol Brice, Clamma Dale & the Houston Grand Opera Orchestra for Gershwin: Porgy and Bess
Best Choral Performance (other than opera)
Georg Solti (conductor), Margaret Hillis (choir director) & the Chicago Symphony Orchestra & Chorus for Verdi: Requiem
Best Classical Performance Instrumental Soloist or Soloists (with orchestra)
Itzhak Perlman & the London Philharmonic Orchestra for Vivaldi: The Four Seasons
Best Classical Performance Instrumental Soloist or Soloists (without orchestra)
Arthur Rubinstein for Beethoven: Piano Sonata No. 18 in E Flat/Schumann: Fantasiestücke, Op. 12
Best Chamber Music Performance
The Juilliard String Quartet for Schoenberg: Quartets for Strings (Complete)
Best Classical Album
Thomas Frost (producer), Leonard Bernstein (conductor), Dietrich Fischer-Dieskau, Vladimir Horowitz, Yehudi Menuhin, Mstislav Rostropovich, Isaac Stern, Lyndon Woodside & the New York Philharmonic for Concert of the Century

Comedy

Best Comedy Recording
Steve Martin for Let's Get Small

Composing and arranging

Best Instrumental Composition
John Williams (composer) for "Main Title From Star Wars"
Best Original Score Written for a Motion Picture or a Television Special
John Williams (composer) for Star Wars 
Best Instrumental Arrangement
Harry Betts, Perry Botkin Jr. & Barry De Vorzon (arrangers) for "Nadia's Theme (The Young and the Restless)" performed by Barry De Vorzon
Best Arrangement Accompanying Vocalist(s)
Ian Freebairn-Smith (arranger) for "Love Theme From A Star Is Born (Evergreen)" performed by Barbra Streisand
Best Arrangement For Voices
The Eagles (arrangers) for "New Kid in Town"

Country

Best Country Vocal Performance, Female
Crystal Gayle for "Don't It Make My Brown Eyes Blue"
Best Country Vocal Performance, Male
Kenny Rogers for "Lucille"
Best Country Vocal Performance by a Duo or Group
The Kendalls for "Heaven's Just a Sin Away"
Best Country Instrumental Performance
Hargus "Pig" Robbins for Country Instrumentalist of the Year
Best Country Song
Richard Leigh (songwriter) for "Don't It Make My Brown Eyes Blue" performed by Crystal Gayle

Folk

Best Ethnic or Traditional Recording
Muddy Waters for Hard Again

Gospel

Best Gospel Performance, Traditional 
The Oak Ridge Boys for "Just a Little Talk With Jesus"
Best Gospel Performance, Contemporary or Inspirational 
The Imperials for Sail On
Best Soul Gospel Performance, Traditional
James Cleveland for James Cleveland Live at Carnegie Hall
Best Soul Gospel Performance, Contemporary
Edwin Hawkins for Wonderful!
Best Inspirational Performance
B. J. Thomas for Home Where I Belong

Jazz

Best Jazz Performance by a Soloist 
Oscar Peterson for The Giants
Best Jazz Performance by a Group
Phil Woods for The Phil Woods Six - Live From the Showboat
Best Jazz Performance by a Big Band
Count Basie for Prime Time
Best Jazz Vocal Performance
Al Jarreau for Look to the Rainbow

Latin

Best Latin Recording
Mongo Santamaría for Dawn

Musical show

Best Cast Show Album
 Martin Charnin (composer), Charles Strouse (composer & producer), Larry Morton (producer) & the original cast with Andrea McCardle & Dorothy Loudon for Annie

Packaging and notes

Best Album Package
John Kosh (art director) for Simple Dreams performed by Linda Ronstadt
Best Album Notes
George T. Simon (notes writer) for Bing Crosby - A Legendary Performer performed by Bing Crosby

Pop

Best Pop Vocal Performance, Female
Barbra Streisand for "Evergreen (Love Theme From A Star Is Born)"
Best Pop Vocal Performance, Male
James Taylor for "Handy Man"
Best Pop Performance by a Group
Bee Gees for "How Deep Is Your Love"
Best Pop Instrumental Performance
John Williams for Star Wars Soundtrack

Production and engineering

Best Engineered Recording, Non-Classical
Al Schmitt, Bill Schnee, Elliot Scheiner & Roger Nichols (engineers) for Aja performed by Steely Dan
Best Engineered Recording, Classical
Kenneth Wilkinson (engineer), Georg Solti (conductor) & the Chicago Symphony Orchestra for Maurice Ravel: Bolero
Producer of the Year
Peter Asher

R&B

Best R&B Vocal Performance, Female
Thelma Houston for "Don't Leave Me This Way"
Best R&B Vocal Performance, Male
Lou Rawls for Unmistakably Lou
Best R&B Vocal Performance by a Duo, Group or Chorus
The Emotions for "Best of My Love"
Best R&B Instrumental Performance
The Brothers Johnson for "Q"
Best Rhythm & Blues Song
Leo Sayer & Vini Poncia (songwriters) for "You Make Me Feel Like Dancing" performed by Leo Sayer

Spoken

Best Spoken Word Recording
Julie Harris for The Belle of Amherst

References

External links
20th Grammy Awards at the Internet Movie Database

 020
1978 in California
1978 music awards
1978 in Los Angeles
1978 in American music
Grammy
February 1978 events in the United States